USS Sea Otter I (IX-51) was a vessel of the United States Navy prior to World War II. The ship was built by Jakobson Shipyard, Oyster Bay, New York and launched on 24 May 1941. Prior to her completion, Sea Otter I had been offered to the Navy for use as a district craft for experimental purposes by her owner, Mr. Roland L. Redmond, of New York City.

Service history
Acquired by the US Navy on 29 May 1941, she was placed in service on 9 July 1941. Sea Otter I operated in waters of the 3rd Naval District. She was placed out of service on 6 November 1941 and struck from the Navy List on 24 June 1942. Sea Otters provision unit was shipped to the Naval Engineering Experimental Station in Annapolis, Maryland, and her hull was scrapped.

Sources

External links
 Photo gallery at navsource.org

Unclassified miscellaneous vessels of the United States Navy
Ships built in Oyster Bay, New York
1941 ships